Marvin Anderson (born 12 May 1982) is a Jamaican sprint athlete.

He finished sixth in the 200m final at the 2007 World Championships in Osaka where he also won a silver medal in the 4 × 100 m relay team for Jamaica. He is a former student of Duncans All Age and William Knibb Memorial High School.

Anderson represented Jamaica at the 2008 Summer Olympics in Beijing. He competed at the 200 metres and placed third in his first round heat after Marlon Devonish and Kim Collins in a time of 20.85 seconds. With this result he qualified for the second round, but he did finish the second race and was eliminated.

He tested positive for the stimulant 4-Methyl-2-hexanamine in June 2009. A disciplinary panel organised by the Jamaican Anti-Doping Commission (JADCO) cleared him of a doping infraction on the grounds that the drug was not on the World Anti-Doping Agency's banned list. However, JADCO appealed their own panel's ruling, stating that the athlete should be disciplined as the drug was similar in structure to the banned substance tuaminoheptane.

References

External links

1982 births
Jamaican male sprinters
Living people
Athletes (track and field) at the 2007 Pan American Games
Athletes (track and field) at the 2008 Summer Olympics
Olympic athletes of Jamaica
People from Trelawny Parish
Doping cases in athletics
Jamaican sportspeople in doping cases
World Athletics Championships medalists
Pan American Games silver medalists for Jamaica
Pan American Games medalists in athletics (track and field)
Medalists at the 2007 Pan American Games
20th-century Jamaican people
21st-century Jamaican people